Anthony Soter Fernandez (22 April 1932 – 28 October 2020) was a Malaysian prelate of the Catholic Church who was the first Malaysian cardinal. He was Archbishop of Kuala Lumpur from 1983 to 2003.

Biography
Anthony Soter Fernandez was born on 22 April 1932 in Sungai Petani, Kedah, Malaysia. He was ordained as a priest of the Diocese of Penang on 10 December 1966.

He was named Bishop of Penang on 29 September 1977. He received his episcopal consecration on 17 February 1978 from Gregory Yong, Archbishop of Singapore.

Pope John Paul II appointed him the second Archbishop of Kuala Lumpur on 30 July 1983 and he was installed there on 10 November 1983.

He served as president of the Catholic Bishops' Conference of Malaysia, Singapore and Brunei from 1987–1990 and 2000–2003.

Pope John Paul accepted his resignation as archbishop on 24 May 2003.

Fernandez was created a cardinal by Pope Francis in the consistory on 19 November 2016, and was the first Malaysian to be made a cardinal.

Fernandez died on 28 October 2020 at the Little Sisters of the Poor St. Francis Xavier Home in Cheras. He had been suffering from tongue cancer for several years. He was buried in the nave of St. John's Cathedral, Kuala Lumpur.

References

External links
 

1930 births
2020 deaths
People from Kedah
Roman Catholic archbishops of Kuala Lumpur
20th-century Roman Catholic archbishops in Malaysia
21st-century Roman Catholic archbishops in Malaysia
Malaysian people of Indian descent
Cardinals created by Pope Francis
Malaysian cardinals
Deaths from cancer in Malaysia
Deaths from tongue cancer
Malaysian Roman Catholic archbishops